The 2021 Duke Blue Devils women's soccer team represented Duke University during the 2021 NCAA Division I women's soccer season.  The Blue Devils were led by head coach Robbie Church, in his twenty-first season.  They played home games at Koskinen Stadium.  This was the team's 34th season playing organized women's college soccer and their 34th playing in the Atlantic Coast Conference.

The Blue Devils finished the season with a 16–4–1 record, 7–2–1 in ACC play to finish in third place.  The lost in the First Round of the ACC Tournament.  They received an at-large bid to the NCAA Tournament where they were awarded one of the top four seeds.  They defeated Old Dominion in the First Round, Memphis in the Second Round, and St. John's in the Round of 16 before losing to Santa Clara in the Semifinals to end their season.

Previous season 

Due to the COVID-19 pandemic, the ACC played a reduced schedule in 2020 and the NCAA Tournament was postponed to 2021.  The ACC did not play a spring league schedule, but did allow teams to play non-conference games that would count toward their 2020 record in the lead up to the NCAA Tournament.

The Blue Devils finished the fall season 7–4–2, 4–2–2 in ACC play to finish in sixth place.  As the fifth seed in the ACC Tournament, they defeated Clemson before losing to eventual champions Florida State in the Semifinals.  The Blue Devils finished the spring season 3–1–1 and received an at-large bid to the NCAA Tournament.  In the tournament, they defeated Arizona State in the Second Round and Ole Miss in the Third Round before losing to Florida State in the Quarterfinals, on penalties to end their season.

Squad

Roster

Team management

Source:

Schedule 
Source:

|-
!colspan=6 style=""| Exhibition

|-
!colspan=6 style=""| Non-Conference Regular season

|-
!colspan=6 style=""| ACC Regular season

|-
!colspan=6 style=""| ACC Tournament

|-
!colspan=6 style=""| NCAA Tournament

Awards and honors

Rankings

2022 NWSL Draft

Source:

References

Duke Blue Devils women's soccer seasons
Duke women's soccer
Duke
Duke
Duke